Samuele Righetti (born 10 October 2001) is an Italian footballer who plays as a defender for  club Cerignola on loan from Perugia.

Club career
He joined the Under-19 squad of Perugia in the 2018–19 season. In the 2019–20 season, he began to receive call-ups to Perugia's senior squad for Serie B games, but did not make his debut that season. On 30 September 2020, he made his first appearance for Perugia in a Coppa Italia 4–1 victory over Ascoli.

On 5 October 2020, he was loaned to Serie D club Aglianese for the 2020–21 season.

Upon his return from loan, he made his Serie B debut for Perugia on 21 August 2021 in a game against Pordenone.

On 31 January 2022, Righetti joined Gubbio on loan.

On 24 January 2023, Righetti moved on loan to Serie C club Cerignola.

References

External links
 

2001 births
Living people
Sportspeople from Perugia
Footballers from Umbria
Italian footballers
Association football defenders
Serie B players
Serie C players
Serie D players
A.C. Perugia Calcio players
Aglianese Calcio 1923 players
A.S. Gubbio 1910 players
S.S.D. Audace Cerignola players